Othenin (died 1338), called the Mad, was a Count of Montbéliard. He was the only son of Reginald of Burgundy and his wife, Guillemette of Neufchâtel. Othenin could not intervene in the affairs of the county because of his mental problems. He was placed under the tutelage of his uncle, Hugh of Chalon. He lived in the reclusive Château de Montfaucon (Castle of Montfaucon), near Besançon, until his death.
Othenin died in 1338. He was buried in the church of Saint-Maimbœuf Montbéliard. Henry I of Mountfacon was named his successor by the Holy Roman Emperor Louis IV.

House of Montfaucon
Counts of Montbéliard
1338 deaths
Year of birth missing
Chalon-Arlay
Royalty and nobility with disabilities